Christoph Budde (11 February 1963 – 1 December 2009) was a German professional footballer who made 42 appearances in the Bundesliga for Borussia Mönchengladbach as a striker between 1985 and 1990.

He died on 1 December 2009 of swine flu, aged 46.

References

External links
 

1963 births
2009 deaths
German footballers
West German footballers
Borussia Mönchengladbach II players
Borussia Mönchengladbach players
Association football forwards
Deaths from influenza
Infectious disease deaths in Germany
Bundesliga players
People from Erkelenz
Sportspeople from Cologne (region)
Footballers from North Rhine-Westphalia